William Charles Braithwaite (23 December 1862 – 28 January 1922) was a British historian, specialising in the early history of the Society of Friends (Quakers).

Braithwaite was born on 23 December 1862, the son of Joseph Bevan Braithwaite (1818–1905) and Martha Gillett (1823–1895). One of his eight siblings was stockbroker Joseph Bevan Braithwaite (1855–1934). He attended Oliver's Mount School, Scarborough, and University College London.

Upon the death of John Wilhelm Rowntree in 1905, Rufus Jones invited Braithwaite to write the early history of the Society of Friends. Rowntree and Jones had set out in 1897 to write a "comprehensive history of Quakerism", but the former died before this was possible. As a result, it is Braithwaite who wrote the two classic histories which popularised this research; The Beginnings of Quakerism in 1912, and The Second Period of Quakerism in 1919.

On 1 January 1922 he received an honorary doctorate in Theology from the University of Marburg.

In 1955 F. J. Smithen stated that The Beginnings of Quakerism was "still regarded as the standard work on the rise and early fortunes of the Quaker movement".

In 1909, Braithwaite gave the second Swarthmore Lecture, entitled "Spiritual Guidance in the experience of the Society of Friends".

He married Janet Morland, and his son was the philosopher Richard Bevan Braithwaite.

Published works 
Red Letter Days; a Verse Calendar (1907)
The Beginnings of Quakerism (1912)
The Message and Mission of Quakerism (1912) (with Henry Theodore Hodgkin (1877-1933))
Foundations of National Greatness (1915)
The Second Period of Quakerism (1919)
Spiritual Guidance in the Experience of the Society of Friends (Swarthmore Lecture 1909)
The penal laws affecting early Friends in England

References 

1862 births
1922 deaths
British Quakers
Historians of Quakerism
Alumni of University College London